Tchériba is a department or commune of Mouhoun Province in western Burkina Faso. Its capital lies at the town of Tchériba. According to the 1996 census the department has a total population of 36,818.

Towns and villages
 Tchériba	(5 610 inhabitants) (capital)
 Bankorosso	(256 inhabitants)
 Banouba	(521 inhabitants)
 Bekeyou	(1 436 inhabitants)
 Beneyou	(170 inhabitants)
 Bissanderou	(1 903 inhabitants)
 Da	(282 inhabitants)
 Didie	(441 inhabitants)
 Djissasso	(1 196 inhabitants)
 Douroukou	(1 360 inhabitants)
 Etouayou	(573 inhabitants)
 Gamadougou	(732 inhabitants)
 Kana	(106 inhabitants)
 	(836 inhabitants)
 Labien	(1 560 inhabitants)
 Lan	(1 135 inhabitants)
 Nerekorosso	(1 058 inhabitants)
 Oualou	(1 959 inhabitants)
 Oualoubié	(349 inhabitants)
 Oula	(1 088 inhabitants)
 Ouezala	(796 inhabitants)
 Sao	(1 991 inhabitants)
 Sirakélé	(775 inhabitants)
 Tierkou	(2 047 inhabitants)
 Tikan	(2 880 inhabitants)
 Tissé	(2 022 inhabitants)
 Youlou	(1 224 inhabitants)
 Zehuy	(2 512 inhabitants)

References

Departments of Burkina Faso
Mouhoun Province